Gina Elena Zefora Lombroso (5 October 1872 in Pavia – 27 March 1944 in Geneva) was an Italian physician, writer, psychiatrist, and criminologist, best remembered for her uncredited writings on the subjects of criminology and psychiatry co-authored with her father Cesare Lombroso, her individual writings on the female condition and industrialisation. She was the wife of Italian historian and writer Guglielmo Ferrero (1871-1942) and hence adopted the surname Ferrero-Lombroso. Their son Leo Ferrero (1903-1933), a writer and playwright, died in a car accident in Santa Fe (USA). All three are buried at the Cimetière des Rois in Geneva, Switzerland.

Notable works 
Sulle condizioni sociali economiche degli operai di un sobborgo di Torino (1896)
I coefficienti della vittoria negli scioper (1897)
Sulle cause e sui rimedi dell'analfabetismo sociale (1898)
I vantaggi della degenerazione (1904)
Cesare Lombroso. Appunti sulla vita. Le opere (1906)
Nell'America Meridionale (Brasile-Uruguay-Argentina) (1908)
Cesare Lombroso. Storia della vita e delle opere narrata dalla figlia (1921)
La donna nella vita. Riflessioni e deduzioni (1923)
Anime di donna. Vite vere (1925)
La donna nella società attuale (1927)
Le tragedie del progresso meccanico (1930)

References 

1872 births
1944 deaths
Female critics of feminism
Italian physicians
Italian writers
Italian psychiatrists
Italian criminologists
Italian women physicians
Italian women writers
Italian women psychiatrists
Italian women criminologists
People from Pavia